The South Wales Evening Post is a tabloid daily newspaper distributed in the South West region of Wales. The paper has three daily editions – Swansea, Neath and Port Talbot and Carmarthenshire – and is published by Media Wales, part of the Reach plc group.  The current editor is Jonathan Roberts. As the name suggests, it had previously been an evening paper, but later moved to a morning daily.

The paper has a circulation of 13,257 as recorded by the ABC in January 2020, down from 40,149 in 2011.

Founded in 1893 as the South Wales Daily Post, the paper changed its name in 1932 to the current title. Former journalists included poet Dylan Thomas, who joined from school in 1930 but left 18 months later to become freelance.

In August 2006, according to the Audit Bureau of Circulation figures, the South Wales Evening Post overtook the Cardiff-based South Wales Echo as the biggest-selling evening newspaper in Wales.

Presently the Post is published six days a week by Media Wales, the company that also publishes the Carmarthen Journal, Neath Port Talbot Courier, and Llanelli Star. The Evening Post produces a range of special features and supplements on entertainment, TV, motoring, property, employment and sport.

In 2012, Local World acquired owner Northcliffe Media from Daily Mail and General Trust.

In 2013 the paper gained national attention during the 2013 Swansea measles epidemic as it had previously led a campaign against the vaccine after misunderstanding Andrew Wakefield's research.

See also
List of newspapers in Wales
2013 Swansea measles epidemic

References

External links

 - Media Wales Website of the South Wales Evening Post

Northcliffe Media
Newspapers published in Wales
Mass media and culture in Swansea
Publications established in 1893
1893 establishments in Wales
Daily newspapers published in the United Kingdom
Newspapers published by Reach plc